German is a given name, often the Slavic form of Herman. For the Spanish given name pronounced with stress in the second syllable see Germán.

People with the name German include:

Art and music
German Galynin, Soviet Russian composer
German Goldenshteyn, Romanian klezmer musician
German Moreno, Filipino actor
German Okunev, Soviet Russian composer

Humanities and social sciences
German Gref, Russian economist
German Kim, Kazakhstani historian
German Sadulaev, Chechen writer and lawyer

Politics
German Galushchenko (born 1973), Ukrainian lawyer and politician
German Kuznetsov, former deputy premier of Kyrgyzstan

Sport
German Apukhtin, Soviet Russian footballer
German Fernandez, American distance runner
German Glessner, Argentine skeleton racer
German Kutarba, Russian footballer
German Lovchev, Russian footballer
German Ruano, Costa Rican footballer
German Skurygin, Russian race walker
German Titov (ice hockey), Russian ice hockey player

Other
Serbian Patriarch German I, Serbian Patriarch (1881–1888)
Serbian Patriarch German, Serbian Patriarch (1958–1990)
German Gardiner, English Catholic martyr
German Sterligov, Russian businessman and environmentalist
German Titov, Soviet Russian cosmonaut

See also
 Germán

Russian masculine given names